Royal Air Maroc Cargo, also branded as RAM Cargo, is the cargo airline subsidiary of Royal Air Maroc based out of Mohammed V International Airport in Casablanca.

Destinations
As of November 2020, Royal Air Maroc Cargo serves the following dedicated freight destinations:

Belgium
 Brussels - Brussels Airport

Cameroon
 Douala - Douala International Airport

Gabon
 Libreville - Léon-Mba International Airport

Germany
 Frankfurt am Main - Frankfurt Airport

Ghana
 Accra - Kotoka International Airport

Ivory Coast
 Abidjan - Félix-Houphouët-Boigny International Airport

Mali
 Bamako - Modibo Keita International Airport

Morocco
 Casablanca - Mohammed V International Airport base

Nigeria
 Lagos - Murtala Muhammed International Airport

Spain
 Madrid - Adolfo Suárez Madrid–Barajas Airport

United Kingdom
 London - Gatwick Airport

Fleet
As of November 2020, RAM Cargo operates the following dedicated freight aircraft:

References

External links 
 

Cargo
Airlines of Morocco
Cargo airlines
Government-owned airlines